A relapse is a recurrence of a past (typically medical) condition. It may also refer to:
Relapse Records, a record label
Relapse (Eminem album), a 2009 album by Eminem
Relapse (Ministry album), a 2012 music album by Ministry
Relapse (EP), a 2002 EP by Oceansize
The Relapse, a 1696 play by John Vanbrugh

See also
 Lapse (disambiguation)
 Time lapse (disambiguation)